Heiðdís Lillýardóttir (born 28 February 1996) is an Icelandic footballer who plays as a centre-back for Breiðablik.

References

External links
 
 

1996 births
Living people
Women's association football defenders
Breiðablik women's football players
Expatriate women's footballers in Portugal
S.L. Benfica (women) footballers
Icelandic women's footballers
Selfoss women's football players
Icelandic expatriate footballers
Icelandic expatriate sportspeople in Portugal